Milena Janković (born on 23 November 1992), better known as Mimi Mercedez is a Serbian rapper and songwriter. She made her debut in 2011 and has so far released four studio albums. On her own songs, Mercedez has predominately worked with beatmaker Žartikal. She is regarded as one of the first and most successful Serbian female rap artists.

Life and career
Janković was born on 23 November 1992 in Belgrade, FR Yugoslavia and grew up in the neighborhood of Konjarnik. She stated that her interest in rap music comes from her late teenage years.

In 2011, she released her first song, titled "Napucane svinjice". It was later included to her independently-released debut album Jedino što znam in 2013. Mercedez was also featured on the track "Mala ima kasko" from the 2012 album "Apetiti mi rastu" by Serbian rapper Juice. During her beginnings, Janković used to work as a stripper to support her music career. In past she used to go by other alter egos, including Guda iz Huda, Sestra Drugarica and Kebasti Koblenc.

In February 2015, Mimi Mercedez released her EP Napaljene uličarke under Bombe Devedesetih. In August, it was followed by her second album Našminkam se i pravim haos. The album included "Kleoptara", which became her first mainstream successful song. Same year, she also collaborated with singers Milan Stanković and Mile Kitić on the single "Gadure". The following August, Mercedez had another mainstream popular song with singer Kaya, titled "Ne možeš da sediš sa nama". In 2018, she released her third studio album Kuma. The following year in February, Mercedez had two duets with singer Stoja: "Sve se vrti oko nas" and "Žena sa Balkana". In October 2019, she released Mržnja, which was preceded by the title track and single "Kučke".

In July 2022, she performed at the EXIT music festival in Novi Sad. In October, during her concert at Tvornica Kulture in Zagreb, Mercedez announced her forthcoming fifth studio album. On December 31, she alongside other artists also had a live show at the closing ceremony of the Novi Sad's year as the European Capital of Culture. On 26 January 2023, Mercedez alongside Voyage presented the Music Awards Ceremony, held at the Štark Arena, during which she also performed "Kleopatra". On 17 February 2023, Mercedez released her fifth album Frka u svemiru under Universal Music.

Discography
Studio albums
 Jedino što znam (2013)
 Našminkam se i pravim haos (2015)
 Kuma (2018)
 Mržnja (2019)
 Frka u svemiru (2023)

References

External links
 

Living people
1992 births
21st-century Serbian women singers
Serbian rappers
Musicians from Belgrade